Doing DaVinci is a popular science television program originally aired on the Discovery Channel in which the hosts attempted to create many of Leonardo da Vinci's inventions. The show aired on a weekly schedule with the first episode broadcast on April 13, 2009.

Team
The inventions are created by a team of six members:
Valek Sykes, a special effects expert and mechanical designer, actor, owner of Tech Works Studios and Exit Biohazard and Crime Scene Cleanup
Bill Duggan, a carpenter and the host of Curb Appeal
Flash Hopkins, an artist, builder, and long time Burning Man personality
Jurgen Heimann, a designer and puppeteer
Alan Bovinett, an entrepreneur and mechanical engineer.
Terry Sandin, a mechanical and animatronics engineer and a host of Prototype This!

The team consults with da Vinci researcher Jonathan Pevsner to understand the inventions and decide on materials for their construction.

Construction
The team first consults with Jonathan Pevsner to decide on materials and map out the basics of the design. The invention is then reconstructed in Autodesk Inventor and Autodesk's Digital Prototyping solutions. Then the team heads to a workshop to begin construction. After the invention is completed it is tested to determine whether or not the build was a success.

Episodes

Notes

American non-fiction television series
2009 American television series debuts
2010 American television series endings
Discovery Channel original programming
Science education television series
Depictions of Leonardo da Vinci on television